Alvin L. Teng (born March 4, 1965) is a retired Filipino professional basketball player who spent 14 seasons in the PBA, mostly with the San Miguel Beermen.

Collegiate career

A native of Davao, he was a latebloomer in basketball, having only started in 1983 while playing for the Rizal Memorial College in his hometown. After a year with the RMC, Alvin enrolled at the Harvardian University in Davao, where he also played for the school team. He soon made it to a selection of Davaoeños which participated in the PABL Founder's Cup. Thus was his first taste of commercial ball-playing in the Big City. While playing for the All-Stars, Alvin was spotted by Arellano team manager and then PABL president Peter Cayco and was promptly recruited to the Flaming Arrows' bench. After enrolling in a management course in Arellano, he played for seven months with the varsity squad before closing out the 1984 PABL season with the ITM team. Teng played for Lagerlite Beer the following year and in September 1986, he was elevated to the pros, along with Magnolia teammate Jeffrey Graves, when the SMC ballclub decided to return to the PBA after a two-conference leave.

Professional career

Nicknamed Robocop, Teng is a bruiser who did all the dirty work and defended the paint, aside from being a gifted scorer, he also loves to play physical and bang bodies underneath. From an unheralded rookie donning the Magnolia Cheese uniform in 1986, he had developed into one of the best power forwards in the league. Alvin was the Most Improved Player in 1988 and he made it to the All-Defensive team six times. He won nine championships, including a grandslam, as part of the star-studded San Miguel Beermen squad from the late 1980s to early 1990s.

In the 1995 season, Teng was unexpectedly traded by San Miguel to Pepsi Mega for Victor Pablo when the Beermen opted to start rebuilding for the future. It was first difficult for Alvin to accept, considering he showed loyalty by staying with San Miguel a year ago despite the offer sheet from Pepsi. He moved to Sunkist the following season but return to Pepsi (now Mobiline Phone Pals) in 1997 when his former coach Norman Black was signed as the ballclub's new head coach. At Mobiline, he was used as a second-string power forward.

He left the league to join the MBA in 1999 – playing for the Laguna Lakers and the Negros Slashers. He returned to the PBA and retired after his stint with the Alaska in 2002.

Personal life

Teng, with his wife Susan, has four children, namely: Alyssa, former UAAP superstar and legend Jeric, Almira, and PBA star Jeron.

Controversy

Teng was unceremoniously terminated by the Negros Slashers on March 16, 2001.  The decision was made owing to his sub-par performance during Game 4 of the MBA Championship Series against the San Juan Knights in 2000 (he was pulled out of that game, sat on the bench, untied his shoelaces and donned his practice jersey), and for not showing up in the following game (he actually called-in sick and did not play).  On July 28, 2001, he filed a complaint against the team before the Office of the Commissioner of the MBA.  Subsequently, on November 6, 2001, he also filed an illegal dismissal case with the Regional Arbitration Branch No. VI of the NLRC, which the Labor Arbiter found his dismissal illegal and ordered the team to pay him Php 2,530,000 representing his unpaid salaries, separation pay and attorney's fees. When the team appealed the case to NLRC, which issued a decision on September 10, 2004, dismissing his complaint for being premature since the arbitration proceedings before the Commissioner of the MBA were still pending when he filed his complaint for illegal dismissal. He filed a motion for reconsideration, but it was denied on March 21, 2005, owing to technicality. He then filed a petition for certiorari with the Court of Appeals assailing the NLRC Decision reinstating with modification the Labor Arbiter's Decision. Then, on February 22, 2012, the first division of the Supreme Court issued a decision upholding the Labor Arbiter's earlier compensation order.

Statistics

Correct as of 2002

Season-by-season averages

|-
| align="left" | 1986
| align="left" | Magnolia
| 11 || 9.09 || .500|| – || 1.000 || 1.36 || .09 || – || .09 || 1.8
|-
| align="left" | 1987
| align="left" | Magnolia/San Miguel
| 34 || 16.8 || .486 || – || .676 || 3.65 || .26 || .02 || .2 || 4.7
|-
| align="left" | 1988
| align="left" | San Miguel
| 67 || 17.2 || .562 || .000 || .702 || 4.57 || .2 || .08 || .67 || 6.4
|-
| align="left" | 1989
| align="left" | San Miguel
| 71 || 25.2 || .574 || .000 || .717 || 7.8 || .2 || .08 || .66 || 11.3
|-
| align="left" | 1990
| align="left" | San Miguel
| 51 || 30.0 || .523 || .000 || .737 || 7.7 || .7 || .1 || .4 || 11.0
|-
| align="left" | 1991
| align="left" | San Miguel
| 64 || 31.3 || .568 || .000 || .762 || 8.0 || .62 || .4 || .62 || 12.6
|-
| align="left" | 1992
| align="left" | San Miguel
| 73 || 27.4 || .512 || .250 || .750 || 6.6 || .5 || .3 || .8 || 9.7
|-
| align="left" | 1993
| align="left" | San Miguel
| 62 || 32.0 || .569 || .000 || .741 || 8.1 || .8 || .34 || .64 || 10.9
|-
| align="left" | 1994
| align="left" | San Miguel
| 52 || 32.3 || .520 || – || .698 || 7.1 || .9 || .3 || .4 || 9.7
|-
| align="left" | 1995
| align="left" | Pepsi Mega
| 29 || 28.5 || .481 || – || .658 || 6.5 || .5 || .3 || .72 || 9.7
|-
| align="left" | 1996
| align="left" | Sunkist
| 38 || 25.1 || .502 || .000 || .754 || 5.6 || .34 || .42 || .15 || 7.4
|-
| align="left" | 1997
| align="left" | Mobiline
| 42 || 23.2 || .596 || .500 || .655 || 3.8 || .8 || .2 || .1 || 8.2
|-
| align="left" | 1998
| align="left" | Mobiline
| 50 || 17.9 || .453 || .000 || .875 || 3.0 || .3 || .3 || .16 || 3.5
|-
| align="left" | 2002
| align="left" | Alaska
| 8 || 5.6 || .250 || – || .500 || 1.25 || – || – || .1 || .6
|-
| align="left" | Career
| align="left" |
| 652 || 25.3 || .538 || .176 || .730 || 6.11 || .5 || 0.23 || .34 || 8.8

See also
Jeron Teng
Jeric Teng

References

1965 births
Living people
Alaska Aces (PBA) players
Centers (basketball)
Filipino men's basketball players
Filipino sportspeople of Chinese descent
Philippine Basketball Association All-Stars
Philippines men's national basketball team players
Pop Cola Panthers players
Power forwards (basketball)
San Miguel Beermen players
Basketball players from Davao City
TNT Tropang Giga players
Arellano Chiefs basketball players